Rochelle Forde (born 1974) is a Saint Vincent and the Grenadines lawyer and politician who has been Speaker of the country's House of Assembly since November 2020.

Career
Forde is a barrister and solicitor, completing her study at the Inns of Court School of Law in London. She has been a legal advisor to various companies, as well as Deputy Chief Commissioner of the Girl Guides Association of Saint Vincent and the Grenadines.

Forde was first elected as a Senator for the Unity Labour Party in December 2005 and was elected Deputy Speaker. She served in that role until 29 January 2010.

In 2018, Forde gave a speech at a rally for Grenada's opposition leader Nazim Burke, passing on "warm fraternal greetings" from Ralph Gonsalves, which some interpreted as an endorsement of the party by the ULP. Gonsalves later said, "An endorsement can only come from the political leader of the ULP."

After the 2020 election, Forde was elected Speaker of the House of Assembly on 30 November 2020 after being nominated by Prime Minister Gonsalves. She is the first woman in the role and also has a female Deputy Speaker. Gonzales had received criticism after appointing and all male Cabinet. Upon her election to the position, Forde said, "[do] not make the mistake of trying to resurrect an old, misguided stereotypical myth which in its folly somehow equated a particular gender with weakness."

Personal life
Forde is a Christian.

References

Living people
1974 births
Saint Vincent and the Grenadines lawyers
Unity Labour Party politicians
Saint Vincent and the Grenadines women in politics
Members of the House of Assembly of Saint Vincent and the Grenadines
Speakers of the House of Assembly of Saint Vincent and the Grenadines
Women legislative speakers
Saint Vincent and the Grenadines Christians